SV Spakenburg is a Dutch football club based in Bunschoten. It was founded in 1931 and currently competes in the Tweede Divisie. It shares a football rivalry with IJsselmeervogels that is also from Bunschoten-Spakenburg.

History
The club was founded on 15 August 1931 as Stormvogels and soon renamed Windvogels. In 1947 it merged with a local gymnastics team to become Sportverening Spakenburg. It joined the Eerste Klasse in the 1970–71 season under coach Joop van Basten, father of legendary Dutch striker Marco van Basten, and clinched their first league title in 1974. It became champions again in 1985, also winning the overall Dutch amateur league title, and in 1987, 2000 and 2008.

It joined the Topklasse for its inaugural season in 2010. In its first season, Spakenburg was one of only three clubs (the other ones being Rijnsburgse Boys and FC Oss) to declare themselves eligible for promotion to Eerste Divisie; despite that, Spakenburg failed to qualify to the competition finals as they ended the regular season in second place behind city rivals IJsselmeervogels.

In the 2022–23 season, Spakenburg had an impressive run in the KNVB Cup competition. On 28 February, Spakenburg defeated FC Utrecht 1–4 away in the quarter-finals and became the third amateur team ever to qualify for the semi-finals.

Current squad
As of 11 April 2020

Out on loan

Derby IJsselmeervogels – Spakenburg 
IJsselmeervogels and SV Spakenburg have been playing at the same level since they were founded. Over the years there an atmosphere had emerged around the derby matches which is unique in amateur football. The club of "the people and the fishermen" (IJsselmeervogels, also known as "The Reds") against the "farmers and clerks" (SV spakenburg, "the Blues"). Their rivalry reached boiling point in 1987, when during the second but last match a bomb made by a supporter of IJsselmeervogels exploded and a linesman was wounded. In the years that followed, until the mid-1990s, the clubs were separated. In 1999, however, the relationship between the two clubs cooled considerably when Spakenburg offered a much money to sign two star players from the "red championship team" (Gérard van der Nooij and Pascal de Bruijn) and have them play for "the Blues". The affair becomes so big that  local government banned the derby for a few year. Since 2002 the peace has returned and IJsselmeervogels and Spakenburg are playing against each other again. It is estimated that the edition of 16 April 2011 was visited by almost 9,000 people. In the stands there are many crowd chants and there is always a great atmosphere. The media spend much time on the derby, which is covered in sports magazines like Voetbal International and Dutch National broadcaster NOS.

Results of the derby since 1970 (introduction First Class (Eerste Klasse))

References

External links 
 Official website

SV Spakenburg
Football clubs in the Netherlands
Association football clubs established in 1931
1931 establishments in the Netherlands
Football clubs in Bunschoten